Cacostola lineata is a species of beetle in the family Cerambycidae. It was described by Hamilton in 1896. It is known from United States.

References

Cacostola
Beetles described in 1896